Here Comes a Riot is a self-produced album by Marzio Scholten's IDENTIKIT which was released on April 17, 2015.

Dutch newspaper NRC.NEXT was the first to review this album on 14 April 2015 and rated it with four (****) stars.

Track listing
Here Comes a Riot - 2:27
Wilco - 7:10
The Day We Lost It All - 5:09
Erath - 7:32
We Stand Alone - 4:58

All compositions by Marzio Scholten

Personnel
Marzio Scholten - Guitar
Lars Dietrich - Alto sax
Jasper Blom - Tenor sax
Sean Fasciani - Electric bass
Niek de Bruijn - Drums

References 

2015 albums
Marzio Scholten albums